Truist Point is a baseball stadium located in High Point, North Carolina and is home to the High Point Rockers of the Atlantic League of Professional Baseball. The ballpark is bordered by Elm, English, Gatewood and Lindsay streets. Truist (formerly BB&T Corporation) is paying $500,000 annually for 15 years for the naming rights.

The stadium hosted its first official event on May 2, 2019, as the High Point Rockers defeated the Sugar Land Skeeters in their first ever Opening Day game.

The ballpark was renamed from BB&T Point to Truist Point in June 2020 due to the 2019 merger of BB&T and SunTrust Banks to form Truist.

The ballpark has also been home to collegiate summer baseball teams in the Old North State League (ONSL): the Deep River Muddogs in 2020 and the High Point Hushpuppies in 2021.

In 2021, North Carolina Fusion U23's men's and women's teams began playing some games at Truist Point.

References

External links
BB&T Point (High Point Rockers website)
Atlantic League of Professional Baseball

Atlantic League of Professional Baseball ballparks
Baseball venues in North Carolina
Buildings and structures in High Point, North Carolina
Sports venues in Guilford County, North Carolina
2019 establishments in North Carolina
Sports venues completed in 2019
Soccer venues in North Carolina
Sports in the Piedmont Triad